Kirkbride may refer to:

 Kirkbride, Cumbria, a village in England 
 Kirkbride Plan, an architectural design devised by Thomas Story Kirkbride
 Alec Kirkbride (1897–1978), British diplomat
 Anne Kirkbride (1954–2015), British soap opera actress
 John Kirkbride (musician) (born 1946), Scottish guitarist and songwriter
 John Kirkbride (athlete) (born 1947), British middle-distance runner
 Julie Kirkbride (born 1960), British MP for Bromsgrove
 Thomas Story Kirkbride (1809–1883), American psychiatrist
 Kirkbride Plan of asylum design
 The B. B. Kirkbride Bible Company, Inc., publisher of the Thompson Chain-Reference Bible.